The legislative districts of Palawan are the representations of the province of Palawan and the highly urbanized city of Puerto Princesa in the various national legislatures of the Philippines. The province and the city are currently represented in the lower house of the Congress of the Philippines through their first, second, and third congressional districts.

History 
Areas now under the jurisdiction of Palawan were represented under the districts of Calamianes, Paragua, and Balabac in the Malolos Congress from 1898 to 1899. Paragua and Balabac had two delegates each, while Calamianes had three. Paragua was later renamed to Palawan in 1903 and Calamianes and Balabac were dissolved and annexed to Palawan.

Palawan later comprised a single assembly district from 1907 to 1972. When seats for the upper house of the Philippine Legislature were elected from territory-based districts between 1916 and 1935, the province formed part of the eighth senatorial district which elected two out of the 24-member senate.

In the disruption caused by the Second World War, two delegates represented the province in the National Assembly of the Japanese-sponsored Second Philippine Republic: one was the provincial governor (an ex officio member), while the other was elected through a provincial assembly of KALIBAPI members during the Japanese occupation of the Philippines. Upon the restoration of the Philippine Commonwealth in 1945, the province continued to comprise a lone district.

The province was represented in the Interim Batasang Pambansa as part of Region IV-A from 1978 to 1984, and elected one representative, at large, to the Regular Batasang Pambansa in 1984. Palawan was reapportioned into two congressional districts under the new Constitution which was proclaimed on February 11, 1987, and elected members to the restored House of Representatives starting that same year.

The passage of Republic Act No. 10171 in 2012 separated Puerto Princesa and Aborlan from the second district to form the third district, which first elected its own representative in the 2013 elections.

Current districts 
The province was last redistricted in 2012, wherein the province gained its third seat in the House. All three incumbent representatives are part of the majority bloc.

Lone District (defunct) 

Notes

At-Large (defunct)

1898–1899

1943–1944

1984–1986

References 

Palawan
Politics of Palawan